Mount Pleasant Township may refer to:

Arkansas
 Mount Pleasant Township, Scott County, Arkansas, in Scott County, Arkansas
 Mount Pleasant Township, Searcy County, Arkansas

Illinois
 Mount Pleasant Township, Whiteside County, Illinois

Indiana
 Mount Pleasant Township, Delaware County, Indiana

Kansas
 Mount Pleasant Township, Atchison County, Kansas
 Mount Pleasant Township, Labette County, Kansas, in Labette County, Kansas

Minnesota
 Mount Pleasant Township, Wabasha County, Minnesota

Missouri
 Mount Pleasant Township, Bates County, Missouri
 Mount Pleasant Township, Cass County, Missouri
 Mount Pleasant Township, Lawrence County, Missouri
 Mount Pleasant Township, Scotland County, Missouri

Ohio
 Mount Pleasant Township, Jefferson County, Ohio

Pennsylvania
 Mount Pleasant Township, Adams County, Pennsylvania
 Mount Pleasant Township, Columbia County, Pennsylvania
 Mount Pleasant Township, Washington County, Pennsylvania
 Mount Pleasant Township, Wayne County, Pennsylvania
 Mount Pleasant Township, Westmoreland County, Pennsylvania

South Dakota
 Mount Pleasant Township, Clark County, South Dakota, in Clark County, South Dakota

Township name disambiguation pages